The spin qubit quantum computer is a quantum computer based on controlling the spin of charge carriers (electrons and electron holes) in semiconductor devices. The first spin qubit quantum computer was first proposed by Daniel Loss and David P. DiVincenzo in 1997, also known as the Loss–DiVicenzo quantum computer. The proposal was to use the intrinsic spin-½ degree of freedom of individual electrons confined in quantum dots as qubits. This should not be confused with other proposals that use the nuclear spin as qubit, like the Kane quantum computer or the nuclear magnetic resonance quantum computer.

Spin qubits so far have been implemented by locally depleting two-dimensional electron gases in semiconductors such a gallium arsenide, silicon and germanium. Spin qubits have also been implemented in graphene.

Loss–DiVicenzo proposal

The Loss–DiVicenzo quantum computer proposal tried to fulfill DiVincenzo's criteria for a scalable quantum computer, namely:

 identification of well-defined qubits;
 reliable state preparation;
 low decoherence;
 accurate quantum gate operations and
 strong quantum measurements.
A candidate for such a quantum computer is a lateral quantum dot system. Earlier work on applications of quantum dots for quantum computing was done by Barenco et al.

Implementation of the two-qubit gate

The Loss–DiVincenzo quantum computer operates, basically, using inter-dot gate voltage for implementing swap operations and local magnetic fields (or any other local spin manipulation) for implementing the controlled NOT gate (CNOT gate).

The swap operation is achieved by applying a pulsed inter-dot gate voltage, so the exchange constant in the Heisenberg Hamiltonian becomes time-dependent:

This description is only valid if:

the decoherence time  is longer than 

From the pulsed Hamiltonian follows the time evolution operator

where  is the time-ordering symbol.

We can choose a specific duration of the pulse such that the integral in time over  gives  and  becomes the swap operator 

This pulse run for half the time (with ) results in a square root of swap gate, 

The "XOR" gate may be achieved by combining  operations with individual spin rotation operations:

It can be made into a CNOT gate by surrounding the desired target qubit with Hadamard gates.

See also
Kane quantum computer
Quantum dot cellular automaton

References

External links 

 QuantumInspire online platform from Delft University of Technology, allows building and running quantum algorithms on "Spin-2" a 2 silicon spin qubits processor.

Quantum information science
Quantum dots